This is a list of the 322 members of the 13th legislature of the Italian Senate that were elected on the 1996 general election. The legislature met from 9 May 1996 to 29 May 2001.

Senators for life are marked with a (L)

Democratic Party of the Left (The Olive Tree)

Labour Federation
Felice Besostri
Antonello Cabras
Giovanni Murineddu
Giancarlo Tapparo
Fausto Vigevani

Social Christians
Pierpaolo Casadei Monti
Guido Cesare De Guidi
Giovanni Russo
Luigi Viviani

Forza Italia

National Alliance

Italian People's Party

Lega Nord

Federation of the Greens
Stefano Boco 
Francesco Bortolotto
Francesco Carella
Fiorello Cortiana
Athos De Luca
Giovanni Lubrano di Ricco
Luigi Manconi
Rosario Pettinato
Maurizio Pieroni
Natale Ripamonti
Carla Rocchi
Edo Ronchi
Giorgio Sarto
Stefano Semenzato

Christian Democratic Centre
Francesco Saverio Biasco 
Francesco Bosi
Giuseppe Brienza 
Melchiorre Cirami
Carmine De Santis 
Francesco D’Onofrio
Franco Fausti
Ombretta Fumagalli Carulli
Agazio Loiero
Riccardo Minardo
Bruno Napoli
Roberto Napoli
Davide Nava
Maria Grazia Siliquini
Ivo Tarolli

United Christian Democrats

Communist Refoundation Party

Italian Renewal
Mario D’Urso
Bianca Maria Fiorillo
Angelo Giorgianni
Adriano Ossicini

Italian Socialist Party
Livio Besso Cordero
Ottaviano Del Turco
Giovanni Iuliano
Maria Rosaria Manieri
Cesare Marini

Patto Segni
Carla Mazzuca Poggiolini

Italian Democratic Movement
Giovanni Bruni

Mixed group
Armin Pinggera
Helga Thaler Ausserhofer
Guido Dondeynaz
Mario Occhipinti
Mario Rigo
Franco Meloni
Luigi Caruso
Giovanni Agnelli (L)
Francesco Cossiga (L)
Giovanni Leone (L)
Leo Valiani (L)
Gianfranco Miglio
Stelio De Carolis
Antonio Duva
Andrea Papini
Oscar Luigi Scalfaro (L)

References

Lists of political office-holders in Italy
Lists of legislators by term
Lists of members of upper houses